Qashm Qavi (also Romanized as Qashm Qāvī; also known as Qashan Qū’ī) is a village in Khir Rural District, Runiz District, Estahban County, Fars Province, Iran. At the 2006 census, its population was 644, in 151 families.

References 

Populated places in Estahban County